Designer drugs are structural or functional analogues of controlled substances that are designed to mimic the pharmacological effects of the parent drug while avoiding detection or classification as illegal. Many of the older designer drugs (research chemicals) are structural analogues of psychoactive tryptamines or phenethylamines but there are many other chemically unrelated new psychoactive substances that can be considered part of the designer drug group. Designer drugs can also include substances that are not psychoactive in effect, such as analogues of controlled anabolic steroids and other performance and image enhancing drugs (PIEDs), including nootropics, weight loss drugs and erectile dysfunction medications. The pharmaceutical activities of these compounds might not be predictable based strictly upon structural examination. Many of the substances have common effects while structurally different or different effects while structurally similar due to SAR paradox. As a result of no real official naming for some of these compounds, as well as regional naming, this can all lead to potentially hazardous mix ups for users. The following list is not exhaustive.

Psychedelics 

A psychedelic substance is a psychoactive drug whose primary action is to alter cognition and perception. Psychedelics tend to affect and explore the mind in ways that result in the experience being qualitatively different from those of ordinary consciousness. The psychedelic experience is often compared to non-ordinary forms of consciousness such as trance, meditation, yoga, religious ecstasy, dreaming and even near-death experiences.

Lysergamides 

Lysergamides are amide derivatives of the alkaloid lysergic acid.

Tryptamines 

Drugs containing the tryptamine moiety are typically substrates for the serotonin receptors, in keeping with their close structural resemblance to serotonin, a neurotransmitter.

Benzofurans

Phenethylamines 

Drugs containing the phenethylamine moiety bear close structural resemblance to dopamine but substitution on the benzene ring gives rise to drugs with a much higher affinity for serotonin receptors.

2C-x 

2C-x class of psychedelics are 2,5-dimethoxy-phenethylamine derivatives.

NBxx

NNxx

DOx 
The DOx family of psychedelics are also known as "substituted amphetamines" as they contain the amphetamine backbone but are substituted on the benzene ring. This gives rise to serotonin agonists similar to the 2C-X class but more resistant to elimination in the body.

Dissociatives 
Dissociatives are a class of hallucinogens which distort perceptions of sight and sound and produce feelings of detachment - dissociation - from the environment and self. This is done through reducing or blocking signals to the conscious mind from other parts of the brain. Although many kinds of drugs are capable of such action, dissociatives are unique in that they do so in such a way that they produce hallucinogenic effects, which may include sensory deprivation, dissociation, hallucinations, and dream-like states or trances. Some, which are nonselective in action and affect the dopamine and/or opioid systems, may be capable of inducing euphoria. Many dissociatives have general depressant effects and can produce sedation, respiratory depression, analgesia, anesthesia, and ataxia, as well as cognitive and memory impairment and amnesia.

Arylcyclohexylamines 
Arylcyclohexylamines are the oldest and most widely used dissociatives. The class includes the well known anaesthetic, ketamine.

Diarylethylamines 
Diarylethylamines began to appear on grey markets only as recently as 2013.

Misc 

 Dizocilpine, MK-801
 PD-137889 (P-89)

Piperazines 
Piperazine containing designer drugs have effects similar to MDMA (ecstasy). This class of drugs are mimics of serotonin that activate 5-HT receptor subtypes that release norepinephrine and dopamine.

Empathogens 
Empathogens are a class of psychoactive drugs that produce distinctive emotional and social effects similar to those of MDMA. Users of empathogens say the drugs often produce feelings of empathy, love, and emotional closeness to others.

MDxx 
Substituted methylenedioxyphenethylamines (MDxx) are a large chemical class of derivatives of the phenethylamines, which includes many psychoactive drugs that act as entactogens, psychedelics, and/or stimulants, as well as entheogens.

Benzofurans 
Benzofurans are similar in structure to MD(M)A but differ in that the methylenedioxy groups have been modified, removing one of the two oxygens in the methylenedioxy ring to render a benzofuran ring.

Miscellaneous polycyclic phenethylamines 
Indane and tetralin-type phenethylamines are vaguely related to their amphetamine analogues.

Only one non-tryptamine indole has been sold, 5-IT. It shows strong MAOI activity.
 5-IT, 5-API, PAL-571

Tryptamines 
Drugs containing the tryptamine moiety are typically substrates for the serotonin receptors, in keeping with their close structural resemblance to serotonin, a neurotransmitter.

Amphetamines 
Substituted amphetamines are a chemical class of stimulants, entactogens, hallucinogens, and other drugs. They feature a phenethylamine core with a methyl group attached to the alpha carbon resulting in amphetamine, along with additional substitutions.

Stimulants 
Stimulants produce a variety of different kinds of effects by enhancing the activity of the central and peripheral nervous systems. Common effects, which vary depending on the substance and dosage in question, may include enhanced alertness, awareness, wakefulness, endurance, productivity, and motivation, increased arousal, locomotion, heart rate, and blood pressure, and the perception of a diminished requirement for food and sleep.

Amphetamines 
Amphetamines are a chemical class of stimulants, entactogens, hallucinogens, and other drugs. They feature a phenethylamine core with a methyl group attached to the alpha carbon resulting in amphetamine, along with additional substitutions.

Cathinones 
Cathinones include some stimulants and entactogens, which are derivatives of cathinone. They feature a phenethylamine core with an alkyl group attached to the alpha carbon, and a ketone group attached to the beta carbon, along with additional substitutions.

Pyrrolidines and Pyrrolidinophenones 
Pyrrolidines are amphetamines with a pyrrolidine group. Pyrrolidinophenones (also called Pyrovalerones) are cathinones (βk-amphetamines) with a pyrrolidine group.

Thiophenes 
Thiophenes are stimulant drugs which are analogues of amphetamine or cathinone where the phenyl ring has been replaced by thiophene.

Tropanes and Piperidines 
Tropane alkaloids occur in plants of the families erythroxylaceae (including coca). Piperidine and its derivatives are ubiquitous building blocks in the synthesis of many pharmaceuticals and fine chemicals.

Oxazolidines 
Oxazolidines are a five-membered ring compounds consisting of three carbons, a nitrogen, and an oxygen. The oxygen and NH are the 1 and 3 positions, respectively. In oxazolidine derivatives, there is always a carbon between the oxygen and the nitrogen.

Phenylmorpholines 
Phenylmorpholines are a class of stimulants containing a phenethylamine skeleton in which the terminal amine is incorporated into a morpholine ring.

Misc

Sedatives 

Sedatives are substances that induces sedation by reducing irritability or excitement. At higher doses they may result in slurred speech, staggering gait, poor judgment, and slow, uncertain reflexes. Doses of sedatives such as benzodiazepines, when used as a hypnotic to induce sleep, tend to be higher than amounts used to relieve anxiety, whereas only low doses are needed to provide a peaceful effect.
Sedatives can be misused to produce an overly-calming effect. In the event of an overdose or if combined with another sedative, many of these drugs can cause unconsciousness and even death.

Opioids 

Opioids have pharmacologic actions resembling morphine and other components of opium.

N-(2C)-fentanyl

Benzodiazepines

Thienodiazepines

GHB analogues

Methaqualone analogues

Misc

Synthetic cannabinoids 

Agonists of the central cannabinoid receptor type 1 mimic the behavioral effects of cannabis.

Classical cannabinoids

Miscellaneous cannabinoids

Indazole based 
Indazole containing cannabinoid receptor agonists include:

Indole based 
Indole containing cannabinoid receptor agonists include:

Quinolinylindoles

Benzoylindoles

Adamantoylindoles

Naphthoylindoles

Phenylacetylindoles

Androgens 
Androgenic anabolic steroids have approved medical uses as well as used illicitly as performance-enhancing drugs to build muscle mass and strength. Anabolic steroids that have been designed to evade detection in sport doping tests are known as "designer steroids".

Testosterone based

DHT based

Estranes

SARMs 
Selective androgen receptor modulators (SARMs) are a novel class of androgen receptor ligands. They are intended to maintain the desirable muscle building effects of anabolic steroids while reducing undesirable androgenic actions (e.g., increased risk of prostate cancer). SARMs that are more selective in their action potentially could be used for a wider range clinical indications than the relatively limited legitimate uses that anabolic steroids are currently approved for.

Others
 3-Aminoisobutyric acid
 Acadesine, AICAR
 AWRQNTRYSRIEAIKIQILSKLRL-amide
 Anserine
 beta-Hydroxybutyric acid

Peptides

GHRH analogues 
GHRH analogues stimulate the release of growth hormone.

Growth hormone secretagogue receptor agonists 
Agonists of the growth hormone secretagogue receptor regulate energy homeostasis and body weight.

Others

PDE5 inhibitors 
PDE5 inhibitors are typically used to treat pulmonary hypertension and erectile dysfunction.

Nootropics

Examples
 Caffeine
 Nicotine
 Methylphenidate
 Tobacco
 Amphetamine
 Adderall
 Dextroamphetamine
 Dexmethylphenidate
 Ethylphenidate
 Lisdexamphetamine
 Noopept
 Vitamin B1
 Vitamin B6
 Vitamin B9
 Modafinil
 Piracetam
 Armodafinil
 Adrafinil
 Cocaine at low doses.
 Pramiracetam
 Phenylpiracetam
 Aniracetam
 Oxiracetam

See also 
 Arylcyclohexylamine
 List of cocaine analogues
 List of fentanyl analogues
 List of methylphenidate analogues
 List of androgens/anabolic steroids
 Substituted amphetamine
 Substituted cathinone
 Substituted phenylmorpholine
 Substituted phenethylamine
 Substituted tryptamine
 PiHKAL
 TiHKAL

References 

Lists of drugs
Designer drugs
Hallucinations